The Outcast is the seventh short story anthology published by the Canberra Speculative Fiction Guild. Printed in 2006 and edited by Nicole R. Murphy, it contains stories from several Australian speculative fiction authors.

Stories
The collection contains the following stories:
 The Future Gun by Shane M Brown
 Things of Beauty by Susan Wardle
 Sacrifice for the Nation by Monica Carroll
 Woman Train by Kaaron Warren
 Bakemono by Maxine McArthur
 The Fallen by Mik Bennett
 The Returned Soldier by Siobhan Bailey
 Awakening the Spirit by Kylie Seluka
 Twisted Beliefs by Cory Daniells
 Blue Stars for All Saviors' Day by Cat Sparks
 $ave G@1axy F@$t! by Steven Cavanagh
 Holding Out for a Hero by Tansy Rayner Roberts
 Watcher by Ross Hamilton
 An Offer Too True To Be Good by Andrew Sullivan
 The Mudfish Goddess by A.M. Muffaz
 The Rubbish Witch by Lily Chrywenstrom
 The Little Wooden Flute by Robert Hoge
 On The Way to Habassan by Richard Harland
 Lead Us Out of the Wilderness by David L Kok
 Mine by Martin Livings

All stories are illustrated by Brian Smith.  The cover art is by Les Petersen.

See also

 Nor of Human
 Machinations: An Anthology of Ingenious Designs
 Elsewhere
 Encounters
 Gastronomicon
 The Grinding House

External links
 CSFG home page
 Maxine McArthur home page
 Les Petersen home page
 Review of The Outcast at ASif!

2006 anthologies
Fantasy anthologies
Science fiction anthologies
Australian anthologies